Agha Ali Ibrahim Akram (Urdu: آغا ابراہیم اکرم), (1989- 1923) better known as A. I. Akram was a Lieutenant-General in the Pakistan Army and a historian. He wrote books about early Muslim conquests. His most famous book The Sword of Allah is a biography of Muslim general, Khalid ibn al-Walid. He retired from the Pakistan Army as Lieutenant-General in 1978. He also served as Pakistan's Ambassador to Spain. He founded the Institute of Regional Studies in 1982 and remained its president till his death in 1989.

Biography
Akram was born in Ludhiana on 22 September 1923 to an Indian Police Officer.
He graduated from Government College Lahore in 1942 and joined the British Indian Army, being commissioned a second lieutenant in the 13th Frontier Force Rifles on 26 November 1942. By October 1945 he held the rank of temporary Captain, a promotion he received on 1 January 1945. He served in Burma in World War II, and first three Indo-Pakistan Wars. After the partition of India in 1947, he preferred to join the Pakistan Army.

He taught military history as Colonel and Chief Instructor at Command and Staff College, Quetta from September 1960 to November 1965,
during which he acutely felt the lack of detailed, clear and objective literature on Muslim military history. It was at this time when he decided to fill the void himself.

His first book, The Sword of Allah, is about the life and campaigns of Khalid ibn al-Walid which was published in 1970 after a five years effort, including visits to battle-fields in Lebanon, Syria, Jordan, Iraq, Kuwait and Saudi Arabia. It has two English editions, and has been translated into Urdu, Arabic, German and Bahasa. For several years it was compulsory reading in the Pakistan Army for entrance to the Staff College and has been on the leadership syllabus in the Malaysian Army. His second book The Muslim Conquest of Persia was published after four years, after visiting the battlefields in Iran and discussions with Iranian scholars. The Muslim Conquest of Egypt and North Africa was his third book, which also took four years of preparations and visits to Egypt and Tunisia. His last book was The Rise of Cordoba, which was published in 1986. To research for writing all these books he learned Arabic, Persian and Spanish and collected an impressive library of historical works.

In 1978, he retired from Pakistan Army as a Lieutenant-General after being superseded by General Zia-ul Haq.
After that he served as Pakistan's Ambassador to Spain for two and a half years. He founded the Institute of Regional Studies in 1982 and remained its president till his death in 1989.

Works
 The Sword of Allah
 The Muslim Conquest of Persia
 The Muslim Conquest of Egypt and North Africa
 The Muslim Conquest of Spain
 The Falcon of the Quraish
 The Rise of Cordoba

References

1923 births
1989 deaths
20th-century Pakistani historians
British Indian Army officers
Indian Army personnel of World War II
Pakistani generals
Pakistani military historians